Robyn Lambird (born 19 January 1997) is an Australian wheelchair racer and model who has cerebral palsy. They won a bronze medal in the Women's 100m T34 at the 2020 Summer Paralympics, becoming the first out non-binary Paralympian to win a medal in addition to being among the first three out non-binary athletes to compete at the Paralympics.

Early and personal life
Robyn Lambird was born on 19 January 1997. Robyn was born in England but moved to Perth, Western Australia at the age of nine. They were diagnosed with cerebral palsy at the age of nine and had surgery to lengthen their hamstrings and achilles tendons.

Lambird models and was the first person in a wheelchair to be featured in one of Target's active-wear campaigns. They have modelled for Tommy Hilfiger, Bonds, and ModiBodi.

Lambird is non-binary and uses they/them and she/her pronouns.

Athletics career
Lambird is classified as T34. They played wheelchair rugby and wheelchair basketball before taking up Para-athletics in 2016. At the 2018 World Para-athletics Grand Prix in Nottwil, Switzerland, they placed second in the Women's 100m T34 and fourth in the Women's 200m T34.

At the 2019 World Para Athletics Championships, Lambird finished fifth in the Women's 100m T34. They won a bronze medal in the Women's 100m T34 at the 2020 Summer Paralympics with a time of 18.68 seconds, becoming the first out non-binary Paralympian to win a medal. They are among the first three out non-binary athletes to compete in the Paralympics, alongside Maz Strong and Laura Goodkind.

At the 2022 Commonwealth Games, they finished 4th in the Women's 100m T34.

References

External links 
 
 
 Athletics Australia Historical Results

1997 births
Living people
Australian wheelchair racers
Paralympic wheelchair racers
Paralympic athletes of Australia
Wheelchair category Paralympic competitors
Athletes (track and field) at the 2020 Summer Paralympics
Athletes (track and field) at the 2022 Commonwealth Games
Medalists at the 2020 Summer Paralympics
Paralympic bronze medalists for Australia
Paralympic medalists in athletics (track and field)
Australian LGBT sportspeople
Australian non-binary people
People with cerebral palsy
Non-binary sportspeople
Models with disabilities
Non-binary models